Drepanocaryum is a genus of flowering plant in the family Lamiaceae, first described in 1954. It contains only one known species, Drepanocaryum sewerzowii, native to west, central and south-central Asia (Iran, Afghanistan, Pakistan, Kyrgyzstan, Turkmenistan, Uzbekistan, Tajikistan).

References

Lamiaceae
Flora of Central Asia
Flora of Western Asia
Monotypic Lamiaceae genera